Horace Andrew "Bud" Olson  (October 6, 1925 – February 14, 2002) was a Canadian businessman, politician, and the 14th Lieutenant Governor of Alberta from 1996 to 2000. He also served as a Member of Parliament, Senator, Minister of Agriculture, and Minister of Economic and Regional Development. He was also a farmer and rancher, and president and operating officer of Farmer's Stockmen's Supplies in Medicine Hat and Lethbridge, Alberta.

Early life
Born in Iddesleigh, Alberta on October 6, 1925. On January 27, 1947, he married Marion Lucille McLachlan. They had four children: Sharon Lee, Andrea Lucille, Juanita Carol and Horace Andrew Jr.

Federal politics
Bud Olson was first elected to the House of Commons of Canada in the 1957 election as a Social Credit Member of Parliament (MP) from Medicine Hat. He was defeated in the Diefenbaker sweep of 1958, but re-elected in 1962, 1963 and 1965.

With the Social Credit Party's English Canadian wing rapidly disintegrating, Olson crossed the floor in 1967 to join the Liberal Party. Olson supported Pierre Trudeau's successful candidacy for the Liberal leadership in 1968, narrowly won re-election as an MP in 1968 and became minister of agriculture in the first Trudeau government. Olson served in that position until he was heavily defeated by Progressive Conservative Bert Hargrave in the 1972 general election. He was one of only four Liberal MPs elected from Alberta in 1968 – all of whom were defeated in 1972. To date, Olson is the last Liberal elected from a rural Alberta riding.

Olson sought a rematch against Hargrave in 1974, but lost by a margin almost as large as he had in 1972. In 1977, Trudeau appointed him to the Senate of Canada. Olson served as leader of the opposition in the Senate in 1979, and returned to Cabinet when the Trudeau Liberals returned to power in 1980.

He served as Minister of Economic and Regional Development from 1980 to 1984, as well as Leader of the Government in the Senate. As one of Trudeau's most powerful ministers, he chaired the cabinet committee on economic development from 1980 to 1983. He was also the minister responsible for the Northern Pipeline Agency from 1980 to 1984,and the government leader in the Senate from 1982 to 1984. It was also Olson's job to promote the government's unpopular National Energy Program in Alberta.

Late life
Olson resigned from the Senate when he was appointed Alberta's 14th Lieutenant-Governor in April 1996. He served in that position until 2000.

Bud Olson died in Medicine Hat in 2002.

Arms

References

External links
 

Lieutenant Governors of Alberta
Liberal Party of Canada MPs
Liberal Party of Canada senators
Canadian senators from Alberta
Members of the House of Commons of Canada from Alberta
Members of the King's Privy Council for Canada
Social Credit Party of Canada MPs
Canadian Lutherans
Alberta Liberal Party candidates in Alberta provincial elections
1925 births
2002 deaths
Members of the Alberta Order of Excellence
20th-century Lutherans